"Yesterday Once More", written by Richard Carpenter and John Bettis, is a hit song by the Carpenters from their 1973 album Now & Then. Thematically the song concerns reminiscing about songs of a generation gone by.  It segues into a long medley, consisting of eight covers of 1960s tunes incorporated into a faux oldies radio program. The work takes up the entire B-side of the album.

The single version of the song peaked at number 2 on the Billboard Hot 100 chart, kept from the number 1 spot by "Bad, Bad Leroy Brown" by Jim Croce.  It was the duo's fifth number two hit and makes them the act with the second-most number two hits on the chart behind Madonna. The song also peaked at number 1 on the easy listening chart, becoming their eighth number 1 on that chart in four years. It is the Carpenters' biggest-selling record worldwide and their best-selling single in the UK, peaking at number 2. Richard Carpenter stated, on a Japanese documentary, that it was his favorite of all the songs that he had written. He has performed an instrumental version at concerts.

According to Cash Box, on June 2, 1973, "Yesterday Once More" was the highest-debuting single at No. 71. By August 4, it had reached No. 1.

Song structure
"Yesterday Once More" is a ballad published in the key of E major.

Reception
Cash Box said that the "hook will knock everyone out."

Personnel
Karen Carpenter – lead and backing vocals, drums
Richard Carpenter – backing vocals, piano, Wurlitzer electronic piano, Hammond organ, orchestration
Hal Blaine – drums
Joe Osborn – bass guitar
Tony Peluso – electric guitar
Earl Dumler – English horn
Uncredited – tambourine

Cover versions
Redd Kross, a rock/punk band from Hawthorne, California covered the song on the 1994 Carpenters tribute album, If I Were a Carpenter. This cover was also released as a double A-side single with Sonic Youth's cover of "Superstar" to promote the album. It reached No. 45 on the UK Singles Chart and No. 84 on the Australian ARIA Charts.
The Spinners covered the song as a medley with "Nothing Remains the Same" in 1981, reaching No. 52 on the U.S. Billboard Hot 100 and No. 45 on the Adult Contemporary chart.

Charts

Weekly charts

Year-end charts

See also
List of Billboard Easy Listening number ones of 1973
List of number-one singles of 1973 (Canada)

References

External links
 

1973 songs
1973 singles
The Carpenters songs
The Spinners (American group) songs
Cashbox number-one singles
RPM Top Singles number-one singles
Oricon International Singles Chart number-one singles
Songs about radio
Songs with lyrics by John Bettis
Songs written by Richard Carpenter (musician)
A&M Records singles
Songs about nostalgia